University of Waterloo is a light rail (on the Region of Waterloo's Ion rapid transit system) and bus station in Waterloo, Ontario, Canada. It is located on the Waterloo Spur rail line, between Columbia Street and University Avenue. It opened in 2019, and its attached bus terminal opened in 2022.

Overview

Located on the campus of the University of Waterloo, the station primarily serves students and employees of the university. The main campus is on the west side of the station, with additional engineering buildings to the southeast and administration buildings to the northeast. In addition, a major bus terminal has opened along an access road to the east, which serves Grand River Transit buses since January 3, 2022, and GO Transit coaches since March 15, 2022.

The station's feature wall consists of glass tiles in a pattern of black, blue, gray, and white.

Access to the platform is from both ends: from the north, directly from the bus terminal road; to the south, there is access to the Laurel Trail on the west side of the tracks only.

The southbound track is also used by freight trains on the Waterloo Spur line, which serves industrial locations in Elmira. These trains only run in the overnight hours after LRT service has halted. To protect the station structure (and the trains themselves), a gauntlet track is in place alongside this station that offsets the freight track a small distance.

History

Before construction of the light rail station, GRT and intercity bus services had been slowly intensifying at a set of stops along the east end of the University of Waterloo's Ring Road near the Davis Centre building, most significantly Grand River Transit (including the 200 iXpress bus which was the predecessor of the Ion light rail system), GO Transit's 25 Waterloo–Mississauga intercity bus route, and the Waterloo Undergraduate Student Association's Fed Bus service.

In 2016, with light rail infrastructure under construction, an adjacent dedicated bus station was announced. It would be east of the rail line and accessed from Phillip Street, shifting some buses off Ring Road and onto public roadways. Later, in 2020, it was announced that over $3 million in additional provincial, federal, and regional funding had been granted for amenities at the new bus station.  This would include several heated waiting shelters and bike storage facilities.

The bus terminal partially opened on January 3, 2022, and then fully opened three weeks later, serving Grand River Transit routes; GO Transit buses switched over on March 15.

References

External links

 

Ion light rail stations
Railway stations in Canada at university and college campuses
Railway stations in Waterloo, Ontario
Bus stations in Waterloo, Ontario
University of Waterloo buildings
2019 establishments in Ontario
Railway stations opened in 2019